The FIVB Volleyball Women's Challenger Cup is an international volleyball competition contested by the senior women's national teams of the members of the  (FIVB), the sport's global governing body. The  inaugural tournament was played between 20 and 24 June 2018 in Lima, Peru. Bulgaria won the inaugural edition, defeating Colombia in the final and qualified for the 2019 Nations League.

The creation of the tournament was announced in October 2017 (alongside with the announcement of the Nations League) as a joint project between the FIVB, the IMG and 21 national federations. The Challenger Cup serves as a qualifying tournament for the aforementioned Nations League. The FIVB Challenger Cup is held before the Nations League Final Round (in 2018 and 2019 editions) but changed it in 2022 edition and the winner earns the right to participate in the next year's Nations League.

A corresponding tournament for men's national teams is the FIVB Volleyball Men's Challenger Cup.

Format

Previous format
The six qualified teams play in 2 pools of 3 teams in a round-robin format. The top 2 teams of each pool qualify for the semifinals. The first ranked teams play against the second ranked teams in this round. The winners of the semifinals advance to compete for the Challenger Cup title. The champion team will qualify for the next year's Nations League as a challenger team.

New format
The eight qualified teams play in a knockout stage format. The top four teams in the quarterfinals will qualify for the semifinals. The winner of the quarterfinal 1 will play a semifinal match against the winner of the quarterfinal 4 and the winner of the quarterfinal 2 will play a semifinal match against the winner of the quarterfinal 3. The winners of the semifinals will advance to compete for the Challenger Cup title. The champion team will qualify for the next year's Nations league as a challenger team.

Qualification

Hosts
List of hosts by number of final championships hosted.

Appearance
Legend
 – Champions
 – Runners-up
 – Third place
 – Fourth place
 – Did not enter / Did not qualify
 – Hosts
Q – Qualified for forthcoming tournament

Results summary

Medals summary

Nations League qualifier

See also
FIVB Volleyball Women's Nations League
FIVB Volleyball Men's Challenger Cup

References

External links
Fédération Internationale de Volleyball – official website

 
Recurring sporting events established in 2018
International women's volleyball competitions
Annual sporting events